Edward Emerson Cuffee (June 7, 1902 – January 3, 1959) was an American jazz trombonist.

Career 
Cuffee moved to New York in the 1920s, where he recorded with Clarence Williams (1927–29) and played with Bingie Madison. He played in McKinney's Cotton Pickers (1929–34) and in Fletcher Henderson's band (1935–38), then with Leon Abbey (1940 and subsequently), Count Basie (1941), Chris Columbus (1944), and Bunk Johnson (1947). Cuffee quit playing professionally after the late 1940s. Cuffee has sometimes been incorrectly referred to as Cuffee Davidson because of erroneous early sources.

References
"Ed Cuffee". The New Grove Dictionary of Jazz.

Further reading
John Chilton, Who's Who of Jazz.

1902 births
1959 deaths
American jazz trombonists
Male trombonists
20th-century American musicians
20th-century trombonists
Jazz musicians from Virginia
20th-century American male musicians
American male jazz musicians
McKinney's Cotton Pickers members